Timothy L. Raynor (born March 15, 1950) is an American actor, stuntman, and stunt choreographer who is best known for his work on Jimmy Huston's 1981 slasher film Final Exam, where he portrayed "The Killer" as well as acting as a fight choreographer.  Raynor has also appeared on television shows such as Life, My Name Is Earl, Do Not Disturb, and Terminator: The Sarah Connor Chronicles.

Personal life 
Raynor is married to actress Chelsea Bond. They have been together since 2004.

External links 

Biography

References 

1950 births
Living people
American male film actors
American male television actors